Evidence of Things Not Seen is quoted from Verse 1 of Hebrews 11. It may also refer to:

 Evidence of Things Not Seen (Gabriel Teodros album)
 Evidence of Things Not Seen (McCallum and Tarry), 2008 art installation
 Evidence of Things Not Seen (song cycle), song cycle by Ned Rorem
 Evidence of Things Not Seen (The West Wing), television episode
 The Evidence of Things Not Seen, essay by James Baldwin
 The Evidence of Things Not Seen (autobiography), autobiography by W. H. Murray